Sebastjan Linke is a Slovenian slalom canoeist who competed from the mid-1990s to the mid-2000s. He won a bronze medal in the C-1 team event at the 1997 ICF Canoe Slalom World Championships in Três Coroas and at the 1996 European Championships in Augsburg.

References

Living people
Slovenian male canoeists
Year of birth missing (living people)
Medalists at the ICF Canoe Slalom World Championships